Lately is the first extended play recorded by American band Ivy, released in May 1994 by Seed Records. Developed in the same year as the formation of the group, Lately is a French pop album with acoustic and general pop influences. Originally conceived by members Dominique Durand and Andy Chase, the pair recruited Adam Schlesinger for additional production and lyrics. Sessions took place in New York City and Paris, where they recorded four original tracks and a cover of Orange Juice's 1984 song "I Guess I'm Just a Little Too Sensitive".

"I Hate December" was released as the EP's only single on January 12, 1996, preceded by a music video that was filmed earlier in 1995. Lately was praised for its non-formulaic production and original material. Ivy was also outed for being unlike other New York City bands. The EP was reissued on August 26, 2003 after Ivy transferred their entire music catalog to Unfiltered Records, a record label founded by Chase during work for his side project Brookville.

Development and legacy 
In early 1994, musicians Andy Chase and Dominique Durand met up to record music together, which would form the basis for Ivy. After enjoying several of the finished products, the pair formed the group and invited Adam Schlesinger to join them. Together they wrote and produced "Get Enough" which was well received by the public. According to writer Steven Blush in his book New York Rock, after Melody Maker named the track "Single of the Week", work on Lately was initiated. For the project, Ivy recorded four original compositions in addition to a cover of Orange Juice's 1984 single "I Guess I'm Just a Little Too Sensitive". The version of the cover that appears on Lately is slightly different compared to the one featured on Ivy's fourth studio album, Guestroom (2002); it was also the band's first cover of a song released. Coincidentally, Ivy toured with Edwyn Collins, the writer of the song, shortly after the EP was released.

Recording sessions for Lately took place throughout early 1994 at The Place in New York City and Studio I'Hôpital Éphémère in Paris. During the meetings, the band members worked with several musicians for the track, including Evan Richey, who handled the cello arrangements for "Can't Even Fake It"; Ted Jensen, who mastered the recordings at Sterling Sound Studios in New York City; and Jean-Pierre Sluys, who served as an assistant mixer to both Chase and Schlesinger. In 2003, Ivy shifted their entire catalog to Chase's newly founded record label Unfiltered Records. Following the release of Chase's side project Wonderfully Nothing (2003) with his band Brookville, Lately (along with Realistic (1995) and Apartment Life (1997)) was reissued on August 26, 2003.

Composition and promotion 
According to the members of Ivy, the release displayed Durand's "heavily accented" vocals and Chase and Schlesinger's "pop melodies and jangly guitars". As described by Ira A. Robbins, editor of The Trouser Press Guide to '90s Rock, Ivy was attempting to bring French pop music back into the American music industry. The lyrics were summarized as "lifting, wispy, and shimmering" by Jay Stowe, a columnist for Spin. Chase and Schlesinger solely produced the EP, while the two plus Durand handled the lyrics.

The record's only single, "I Hate December", was released on January 12, 1996 as a remix on a CD single. However, the release was issued by Scratchie Records instead of Seed, as the band had departed from the latter label after completing Realistic. A music video for it was produced by Doug Werby and released sometime in 1995. Schlesinger described the inspiration behind the track as being an "anti-Christian single" and called the remixed version "groovy".

"I Guess I'm Just a Little Too Sensitive" was covered in an acoustic style. Robbins and Vickie Gibbons of Trouser Press noted that Durand's pronunciation of "little" in the track sounded more like "lee-dull".

Critical reception 

AllMusic's Nitsuh Abebe was generally positive towards Lately, claiming that "its five songs let their dreamier elements come straight from the [...] songwriting" and that it is an example of "sophisticated pop that Ivy created". Stowe from Spin wrote that Ivy was unlike other New York City bands in the way that they catered to "unabashed pop melodies", and later joked that the "concept [is] so far out it's in"; Stowe also described their version of "I Guess I'm Just a Little Too Sensitive" as a "charming" and "special treat".

Track listing

Personnel 
Credits adapted from the liner notes of Lately.

Andy Chase – engineering, executive producer, mixing
Dominique Durand – lead and background vocals
Ned Farr – photography
Ted Jensen – mastering
Peter Nashel – producer
Evan Richey – cello
Adam Schlesinger – engineering, executive producer, mixing
Jean-Pierre Sluys – assistant mixing

Release history

References 

Works cited

External links 
 

1994 EPs
Ivy (band) albums